Elif Sıla Aydın (born April 11, 1996) is a Turkish women's handballer, who plays in the Turkish Women's Handball Super League for Konyaaltı Belediyesi SK, and the Turkey national team. The -tall sportswoman plays in the left wing position.

Private life
Elif Sıla Aydın was born in Ankara, Turkey on April 11, 1996. After finishing the high school, she took part in prep courses at Ankara Performance Sport Academy. In 2014, she was qualified to study physical education and sports at the Gazi University after completing the courses.

Playing career

Club
Elif Sıla Aydın plays for her hometown team Yenimahalle Bld. SK. She took part at the 2014–15 Women's EHF Cup, 2015–16 Women's EHF Cup Winners' Cup and 2015–16 Women's EHF Champions League matches.

She enjoyed league champion title at the end of the 2014–15 season, and won the 2015 Turkish Cup with her team.

International
Aydın was admitted to the Turkey women's national handball team in October 2015. She played at the 2016 European Women's Handball Championship qualification matches.

Honours
Turkish Women's Handball Super League
 Winner (1): 2014–15.

Turkish Women's Handball Cup
 Winner (1): 2015.

References 

1996 births
Sportspeople from Ankara
Turkish female handball players
Yenimahalle Bld. SK (women's handball) players
Turkey women's national handball players
Living people
Mediterranean Games competitors for Turkey
Competitors at the 2022 Mediterranean Games
21st-century Turkish sportswomen